Victor Plantevin (7 September 1900 - 18 December 1983) was a French politician.

Plantevin was born in Burzet.  He represented the National Centre of Independents and Peasants (CNIP) in the National Assembly from 1951 to 1958.

References

1900 births
1983 deaths
People from Ardèche
Politicians from Auvergne-Rhône-Alpes
Republican Party of Liberty politicians
National Centre of Independents and Peasants politicians
Deputies of the 2nd National Assembly of the French Fourth Republic
Deputies of the 3rd National Assembly of the French Fourth Republic